In set theory, Easton's theorem is a result on the possible cardinal numbers of powersets.   (extending a result of Robert M. Solovay) showed via forcing that the only constraints on permissible values for 2κ when κ is a regular cardinal are

 

(where cf(α) is the cofinality of α) and

Statement 

If G is a class function whose domain consists of ordinals and whose range consists of ordinals such that
 G is non-decreasing,
  is regular for each α in the domain of G,

then there is a model of ZFC such that

for each  in the domain of G.

The proof of Easton's theorem uses forcing with a proper class of forcing conditions over a model satisfying the generalized continuum hypothesis.

The first two conditions in the theorem are necessary.  Condition 1 is a well known property of cardinality, while condition 2 follows from König's theorem.

In Easton's model the powersets of singular cardinals have the smallest possible cardinality compatible with the conditions that 2κ has cofinality greater than κ and is a non-decreasing function of κ.

No extension to singular cardinals 

 proved that a singular cardinal of uncountable cofinality cannot be the smallest cardinal for which the generalized continuum hypothesis fails. This shows that Easton's theorem cannot be extended to the class of all cardinals. PCF theory shows that the values of the continuum function on singular cardinals are strongly influenced by the values on smaller cardinals, whereas Easton's theorem shows that the values of the continuum function on regular cardinals are only weakly influenced by the values on smaller cardinals.

See also 

 Singular cardinal hypothesis
 Aleph number
 Beth number

References 

Set theory
Theorems in the foundations of mathematics
Cardinal numbers
Forcing (mathematics)
Independence results